The 2010 Walsall Metropolitan Borough Council election took place on 6 May 2010 to elect members of Walsall Metropolitan Borough Council in the West Midlands, England. One third of the council was up for election and the Conservative Party stayed in overall control of the council.

After the election, the composition of the council was:
Conservative 33
Labour 17
Liberal Democrats 6
Independent 2
Democratic Labour Party 1
Vacant 1

Election result
The results saw the Conservative remain in control of the council, with no change in their majority. Labour gained Birchills-Leamore from the Conservatives, but also lost St Matthews back to the Conservatives.

One seat was vacant in Bloxwich West after the election, as the former Conservative mayor of Walsall Melvin Pitt, whose seat had not been up for election, died on election night.

Ward results

References

2010 English local elections
May 2010 events in the United Kingdom
2010
2010s in the West Midlands (county)